Irina Falconi (born May 4, 1990) is an Ecuadorian-born American tennis player. She moved to Manhattan, New York, as a toddler. Her highest WTA singles ranking is world No. 63, which she reached in May 2016. Her career-high in doubles is No. 70, set in June 2013.

Professional career

Falconi played college tennis at Georgia Tech where she was a two times ITA All-American and 2010 ACC Player of the Year.

She was given a wildcard into the 2010 US Open qualifying tournament and managed to qualify defeating Mona Barthel, Anastasia Pivovarova and Stéphanie Dubois.

She went out in the first rounds of the Australian Open, the French Open, and Wimbledon.
The 2011 US Open was more successful for Falconi when she defeated Klára Zakopalová and Dominika Cibulková, before losing to Sabine Lisicki.

In March 2020, she competed at the Indian Wells Challenger for the last time in a pro match on tour.

In 2021, it was reported that Falconi was working as a traveling coach for American Danielle Lao.

Grand Slam performance timelines

Singles
This table is current through the 2021 Australian Open.

Doubles

WTA career finals

Singles: 1 (title)

Doubles: 3 (3 runner-ups)

ITF Circuit finals

Singles: 14 (6 titles, 8 runner–ups)

Doubles: 14 (3 titles, 11 runner–ups)

See also

 List of Georgia Institute of Technology athletes

References

External links

 
 
 Georgia Tech bio

1990 births
Living people
American female tennis players
Ecuadorian emigrants to the United States
Georgia Tech Yellow Jackets women's tennis players
Tennis players at the 2011 Pan American Games
Pan American Games silver medalists for the United States
Pan American Games gold medalists for the United States
People from Portoviejo
Tennis players from Atlanta
Pan American Games medalists in tennis
Medalists at the 2011 Pan American Games